Zwickau is an electoral constituency (German: Wahlkreis) represented in the Bundestag. It elects one member via first-past-the-post voting. Under the current constituency numbering system, it is designated as constituency 165. It is located in southwestern Saxony, comprising most of the Zwickau district.

Zwickau was created for the inaugural 1990 federal election after German reunification. Since 2021, it has been represented by Matthias Moosdorf of the Alternative for Germany (AfD).

Geography
Zwickau is located in southwestern Saxony. As of the 2021 federal election, it comprises the entirety of the Zwickau district excluding the municipalities of Callenberg, Gersdorf, Hohenstein-Ernstthal, and Oberlungwitz and the Verwaltungsgemeinschaften of Limbach-Oberfrohna and Rund um den Auersberg.

History
Zwickau was created after German reunification in 1990, then known as Zwickau – Werdau. In the 2002 and 2005 elections, it was named Zwickauer Land – Zwickau. It acquired its current name in the 2009 election. In the 1990 through 1998 elections, it was constituency 327 in the numbering system. In the 2002 and 2005 elections, it was number 167. In the 2009 election, it was number 166. Since 2013, it has been number 165.

Originally, the constituency comprised the independent city of Zwickau, the Landkreis Zwickau district, and the Werdau district. In the 2002 and 2005 elections, it comprised the independent city of Zwickau and the Zwickauer Land district. It acquired its current borders in the 2009 election.

Members
The constituency was first represented by Michael Luther of the Christian Democratic Union (CDU) from 1990 to 2013. He was succeeded by Carsten Körber in 2013. Michael Moosdorf won the constituency for the Alternative for Germany (AfD) in 2021.

Election results

2021 election

2017 election

2013 election

2009 election

Notes

References

Federal electoral districts in Saxony
1990 establishments in Germany
Constituencies established in 1990
Zwickau (district)